The 1983 Mississippi gubernatorial election took place on November 8, 1983, in order to elect the Governor of Mississippi. Incumbent Democrat William Winter was term-limited, and could not run for reelection to a second term. , this is the last time that Hinds County has voted for the Republican candidate.

Democratic primary
No candidate received a majority in the Democratic primary, so a runoff was held between the top two candidates. The runoff election was won by Attorney General William Allain, who defeated former Lieutenant Governor Evelyn Gandy.

Results

Runoff

General election

Campaign
In the campaign, the private detective Rex Armistead, formerly with the Mississippi State Sovereignty Commission, helped to spread rumors that Allain had sexual intercourse with two African-American male transvestites.<ref name="Time">[https://web.archive.org/web/20110604160843/http://www.time.com/time/magazine/article/0,9171,926319-3,00.html "Elections '83; A Winning Round", Time magazine]</ref> Allain denied the charges. The transvestites went on the record with a lie detector but in 1984, after the election had been held, they claimed that they had never met Allain and had been paid for their testimony.  
Bramlett lost the general election, 288,764 (38.9 percent) to Allain's 409,209 (55.1 percent). Charles Evers, the African American civil rights activist from Fayette, ran as an Independent and polled 30,593 (4.1 percent). Carmichael ran in 1983 for lieutenant governor against the incumbent Democrat Brad Dye, who prevailed with 464,080 votes (64.3 percent) to Carmichael's 257,623 (35.7 percent). Bramlett hence outpolled Carmichael by just over 31,000 votes when both were on the ballot as ticket mates.

Results

 Legacy and historiography 
Historian David Sansing described the 1983 contest as "one of the most tumultuous campaigns in the history of Mississippi politics." Journalist Charles Overby wrote that the sex scandal accusations were "a lot stranger than fiction". The allegations and the 1983 campaign have been covered in several works, including William Franklin West's 1995 master's thesis, The Case of the Reluctant Story: The Allain Sex Scandal; a chapter in Jere Nash and Andy Taggart's Mississippi Politics; and several pages in John Howard's 199 book on gay history in Mississippi, Men Like That''.

References

Works cited 
 

1983
gubernatorial
Mississippi
November 1983 events in the United States